Dens Park, officially known as Kilmac Stadium for sponsorship reasons, is a football stadium in Dundee, Scotland, which is the home of  club Dundee F.C. and has a capacity of . Tannadice Park, the home of rivals Dundee United, is just 200 yards (183 metres) away.

History
Dundee moved to "Dens" from their first stadium at Carolina Port in 1899.

Following Dundee's successful league campaign during the 1998–99 season, Dens park had to be redeveloped to adhere to the new Scottish Premier League seat-capacity guidelines. Dundee were therefore required to redevelop the East and West terraces. Barr Stadium Construction were charged with the task of removing the existing concrete terraces and the construction of two 3,000-seat stands. The stands were built in a record time of 82 days for the start of the 1999–00 season. The two near-identical single-tier Bobby Cox and Bob Shankly Stands sit at either end of the ground. The former usually houses home supporters while the latter houses the away supporters. A new Club Shop and ticket office were also built. Undersoil heating was installed in 2005.

Dens Park has hosted two Scottish League Cup finals and, on 25 November 2007, hosted its first Scottish Challenge Cup final. Dens also has the distinction of being one of only two stadia within Dundee to have held full Scottish Internationals, having held the event thrice. The other Dundee ground to have held an international was Carolina Port. Dens Park was named best pitch in Division 1 in 2008. The record attendance at Dens Park is 43,024, which was set in 1953 when Dundee played host to Rangers in the Scottish Cup.

Also in 2007, Dens Park along with McDiarmid Park in Perth, hosted group 4 UEFA European Under-19 Championship Elite Round games. Scotland, Portugal, Turkey and Georgia faced off against each other in April between the 23rd and 28th in a bid to qualify for 2007 UEFA European Under-19 Championship. Dundee's own Kevin McDonald played in Scotland's campaign which attracted the Dundee crowd. A few of the youngsters that played in these games went on to become big names in football including: Fábio Coentrão, Rui Patrício, Daniel Carriço, Ross McCormack and Onur Kıvrak. Portugal won the group with seven points (two wins and one draw against Georgia) and so advanced to the finals.

Future

In 2002, plans were drawn up for a new stadium to be built in the city as part of Scotland's bid to host the 2008 European Football Championship. This stadium would have been shared by Dundee and near-neighbours Dundee United, which would have required the two to leave their historic grounds at Dens Park and Tannadice Stadium respectively. The stadium was planned for construction on a new site at Caird Park. Scotland was not successful in their bid, however, and so these plans were postponed. They could be resurrected should Scotland launch a successful bid for future European Championships. Both clubs strongly oppose a ground sharing agreement but were interested in a new ground sharing arrangement that would have taken place if Ukraine and Poland had failed to meet UEFA's expectations for hosting Euro 2012.

In late 2007, Dundee announced plans to sell much of the land south of the pitch to a real-estate developer. As part of the plans, new flats/houses would be constructed on the presently unused portion of the land and a new southern stand would be freely constructed alongside the pitch. This would significantly increase the capacity of the stadium and would upgrade facilities at the club. In early 2008, Dundee's Chief Executive Officer Dave MacKinnon announced that the club should have "positive news" regarding the project. However, nothing more was heard on the matter and at present there are no plans to make any changes to the ground.

In May 2009, it was reported that the stadium is owned by local businessman John Bennett who, despite having invested heavily in Dundee, has rejoined the Dundee United board, where he had previously been a director until September 2008.

In October 2014, Dundee Supporter's Society announced they have put forward plans to then club chairman Bill Colvin which may allow the club to buy back the stadium from current owner John Bennett. They also expressed, this was not a plan to enable the Supporter's Society to own the Stadium but for the club themselves, they said they will "simply administer the scheme".

In April 2015, Colvin announced that negotiations were taking place to buy back the Stadium from current owner John Bennett and his company Sandeman Holdings.

In August 2016, club owners John Nelms and Tim Keyes were reported to have bought land in the Camperdown area of Dundee, next to the city's Ice Arena. It was then made clear in February 2017 that the plan for this land was to develop a new stadium for the club due to the increasing maintenance costs of Dens Park, although plans for a move were described by Nelms as being "early doors" in a video interview published on the club's website. Documents related to the proposed new stadium were submitted in August 2017, ahead of a formal planning application.

In June 2022, Dundee would move their day-to-day operations away from Dens Park and into Dundee and Angus College's Gardyne Campus.

Greyhound racing

In 1932 Dundee FC agreed a lease with the Dundee Greyhound Racing Company Ltd for a period of ten years for a nominal capital of £25,000. The first night of greyhound racing took place on 9 November 1932 with grass having replaced the existing cinder running track and the main grandstand was fitted out with a glass front to allow patrons the ability to watch racing in all weathers. This new facility also contained a refreshment counter and a totalisator booth. A large totalisator board was erected on the Dens Road side of the ground.

John Jolliffe a private trainer moved to Scotland in 1932 and took over as General and Racing Manager at Dens Park for a period of three years before moving onto the larger Holburn Stadium in Aberdeen in 1935. He introduced selling races at the track and the racing took place under National Greyhound Racing Club (NGRC) rules. Distances raced over were 260, 450, 460 and 650 yards. Greyhound racing ended at the end of
May 1936 due to the liabilities of the company resulting in a winding up order. In 1937 an attempt to start racing nearby at the East Craigie FC ground failed due to local protests.

The second period of racing came over fifty years later in 1992 when Ron Dixon arrived at the football club. The Canadian businessman owned a company called Dundee Leisure and was the new chairman of the football club. He secured planning permission for a greyhound track and new car parking facilities with further plans to build a new stand, a conference centre and an ice rink on site. The 400-metre circumference sand greyhound track was constructed and a Bramwich Hare was installed in addition to a Datatote totalisator system. Racing started on 21 October 1994 under the management of Eddie Ramsay but Dixon's vision never materialised with the greyhound racing ending on 11 December 1996.

References

Dundee F.C.
Football venues in Dundee
Sports venues in Dundee
Scottish Premier League venues
Scottish Football League venues
Scottish Professional Football League venues
Scotland national football team venues
Sports venues completed in 1899
1899 establishments in Scotland
Defunct greyhound racing venues in the United Kingdom
Greyhound racing in Scotland